Mia Van Roy (born October 15, 1944 in Turnhout, Belgium) is a Flemish film and television actress.

Her husband is journalist Piet Piryns and her daughter is the Groen Senator, Freya Piryns.

Roles 
She starred in Dutch movies made for television and once doubled for the Flemish actress, Willeke van Ammelrooy in the Belgian remake of Fons Rademakers’ "Mira". She also starred in an episode of the 2011 French soap opera, Louis la Brocante.

References

External links

Flemish television actresses
People from Turnhout
1944 births
Living people
Flemish film actresses
21st-century Flemish actresses